Cinelicious Pics is a distribution wing of the post-production company Cinelicious, launched by Paul Korver and Dennis Bartok, former American Cinematheque head programmer.

The company was designed to distribute new U.S. and foreign independent features and documentaries.

In November 2014, the company announced it would release Eiichi Yamamoto's cult-classic Kanashimi no Belladonna (Belladonna of Sadness) as its first restoration and re-release, with restoration work completed in-house.

LA Weekly announced Cinelicious Pics as Best Indie Film Distributor of 2015.

Releases
 Dark Night, 2016 -Directed by Tim Sutton
 Giuseppe Makes a Movie – directed by Adam Rifkin (U.S. 2014)
 Thou Wast Mild and Lovely – directed by Josephine Decker (U.S. 2014)
 Butter on the Latch – directed by Josephine Decker (U.S. 2014)
 Gangs of Wasseypur – directed by Anurag Kashyap (India 2013)
 Elektro Moskva – directed by Elena Tikhonova and Dominik Spritzendorfer (Russia 2013)
 Metalhead  – directed by Ragnar Bragason (Iceland 2013)
 The Mend – directed by John Magary
 Jane B. par Agnès V. – directed by Agnès Varda (France, 1988)
 Kung Fu Master – directed by Agnès Varda (France, 1988)
 Kanashimi no Belladonna (Belladonna of Sadness) – directed by  Eiichi Yamamoto (Japan, 1973)
 Bara no Sōretsu (Funeral Parade of Roses) – directed by  Toshio Matsumoto (Japan, 1969)
 Private Property – directed by Leslie Stevens (U.S. 1960)

References

Film distributors of the United States
Companies based in Los Angeles County, California